William Angliss Institute of TAFE is a TAFE institute located in the Melbourne CBD,  Victoria, Australia providing  training and vocational education in Hospitality, Tourism and Culinary Arts. It is the oldest and largest provider of hospitality training in Victoria, with the capacity to train up to 1400 chefs and patissiers a year.

The Institute has participated in projects in China,  Vietnam, Malaysia, Cambodia, Laos, Thailand, Singapore, Tonga and Samoa. International joint venture campuses are located in China at Shanghai University, Shanghai, Nanjing Institute of Tourism and Hospitality, Nanjing, Zhejiang Tourism College, Hangzhou, China Tourism Management Institute, Tianjin.

The Institute offers accredited traineeships and apprenticeships, certificates, diplomas and advanced diplomas, short courses, graduate certificates, bachelors and master degrees.

Campus

Singapore Campus

The Singapore Workforce Development Agency (now known as Skills Future Singapore) appointed the William Angliss Institute in 2011 to set up an integrated CET Centre to deliver training for the tourism and hospitality industries and conduct national skills assessment for existing skills tourism workers. Together with WDA, the Institute collaborated to build the Centre into a leading tourism training institute for Singaporeans.

The qualifications and training opportunities available under William Angliss Institute Singapore include WSQ qualifications and short courses and Australia's AQF qualifications and short courses. The Institute's qualifications are delivered at Higher Certificate, Advanced Certificate, Diploma and Graduate Diploma level under the WSQ Frameworks in:

Tourism

Event Management

Hotel and Accommodation Services

Food Service (Food and Beverage Services)

Retail Services

And at the Advanced Diploma level under the AQF Framework in Hospitality Management.

Sri Lanka Campus

As a joint venture of SLIIT, Colombo Academy of Hospitality Management (CAHM) and William Angliss Institute (WAI), Australia launched the first ever internationally recognized school for hospitality management in Sri Lanka. Press conference to announce the launch was held on 17 July 2012 at the Atrium lobby, Cinnamon Grand Hotel, Colombo amidst large gathering of distinguish guests, media, staff and representatives from WAI, Australia.

History
In 1940 Melbourne businessman Sir William Charles Angliss donated money to start a specialist trade or technical school specialising in providing training and education opportunities for the hospitality and foods industries. Initially called the William Angliss Food Trades School, apprenticeship courses were offered in pastry, butchery, breadmaking and baking, cooking and waiting.

As links with the Food and Hospitality industries developed additional courses in hospitality administration, catering, and food and beverage service were initiated during the 1960s. Courses in Tourism were added in the 1970s. These changes lead to the school being renamed first the William Angliss College and then as William Angliss Institute of TAFE.

In 2001 the Travel and Tourism Department of the Institute developed a 3-month short course in Dance Music Event Operations, to provide training in line with the growth of Melbourne's electronic dance scene. The course received accreditation by the Victorian Qualifications Authority in 2003.

The Institute started The Coffee Academy in 2002 offering three-hour Coffee@Home courses on a monthly basis, as well as more advanced sessions in coffee sensory evaluation, fully accredited courses in Espresso Making using quality commercial machines and even overseas coffee tours.

Embracing technology, the Institute purchased bulk phone-PDAs in 2005 in a pilot program to run teacher designed flash animation games to help deliver training, multimedia assignments and assessments for subjects such as coffee making, waiting, pastry baking, meat processing and event management.

France's most decorated chef, Paul Bocuse, lectured cookery students at William Angliss Institute in 2006.

Notable alumni
 Pricilia Carla Yules - Indonesian professional chef, TV Personality, model and beauty pageant titleholder who won the title of Miss Indonesia 2020, and Miss World Asia 2021.
 Gillian Chung Ka-Lai - Hong Kong Singer and Actress.
 Michelle Anne Garnaut - Australian restaurateur and cook best known for her TV cooking show series.

See also
National Indigenous Training Academy

References

Education in Victoria (Australia)
Educational institutions established in 1940
1940 establishments in Australia